Panisea yunnanensis is a species of plant in the family Orchidaceae. It is native to China (Yunnan Province) and to Vietnam.

References

yunnanensis
Orchids of China
Orchids of Vietnam
Endangered plants
Plants described in 1980
Taxonomy articles created by Polbot